Elmina Estate (Ladang Elmina in the Malaysian language) is an oil palm plantation in Petaling District, Selangor, Malaysia. It is currently owned and operated by Sime Darby Berhad.

History
Established in 1917 shortly after the nearby Tennamaram Estate, Elmina Estate is the second-oldest oil palm plantation in Malaysia. The Selangor Oil Palm Company Ltd. of Edinburgh, Scotland  purchased the  estate in 1923 and opened a new oil palm factory there in 1927. Beginning in the 1930s, it was a site for oil palm breeding experiments that contributed significantly to the selection of modern planting material. Kumpulan Guthrie Berhad owned the estate as of 2006, just prior to their 2007 merger with Sime Darby.
Inside the estate is also the crash site of a Japanese Airlines (JAL) flight that was arriving into Subang Airport.

References

1917 establishments in British Malaya
Petaling District
Palm oil companies of Malaysia
Agriculture companies established in 1917